Mukhtiar Chadha is a Punjabi romantic comedy film starring Diljit Dosanjh and Oshin Brar. The film is directed and written by Director Gifty while it is produced by Ohri Productions & Wahid Sandhar Showbiz and by presentation of Eros International. The other roles are done by Yashpal Sharma, Kiran Juneja, Vikash Kumar, Jaswant Rathore and Rajasthani comedian Khayali. Dialogues of the film are written by Raman k Jangwal & Manoj Sabberwal.

Cast
 Diljit Dosanjh as Mukhtiar Chadha
 Oshin Brar as Dimple
 Yashpal Sharma as Chidi Hussain
 Kiran Juneja as Mukhtiar's Mother
 Inderpal Singh as Mukhtiar's maternal uncle
 Vikash Kumar as Scientist
 Khayali Saharan as Balingdi

Plot
Mukhtiar Chadha (Diljit Dosanjh) is a Delhi-based jack of all trades, without a stable source of income. He lives with his widowed mother (Kiran Juneja), and does a variety of professions including being a property dealer, and sometimes being a con-artist. He is also an avid investor in stocks. Mukhtiar also falls in love with his neighbor (Oshin Brar), though the girl's father does not approve of him.

Trouble arises for Mukhtiar, when he brokers a land deal, but the buyers (Yashpal Sharma and Khayali Ram) illegally grab his client's land by only making a part payment to his client. Mukhtiar fights those goons and manages to defeat them.

Planning and Shooting
Director Gifty (Chetan Parwana) and Diljit Dosanjh decided about movie while working on music track called Kharku. Yashpal Sharma claimed he was the funniest villain ever to be seen in Punjabi cinema and termed the film as hardcore comedy. Oshin Brar was also part of music video Kharku when she was offered this film. She had to walk barefoot on desert sand while shooting the movie song Main Deewani at Jaisalmer thus burning her feet and in conditions of 55 degree Celsius temperatures she was dehydrated.

Promotions
During Promotions Diljit revealed his character Mukhtiar Singh Chadha is seen with a typical Delhi Sikh trader accent, for which he took diction classes in Old Delhi. Oshin Brar also visited an education institute in Hisar for the promotions. For promotions of Dilwale and Mukhtiar Chadha together on an entertainment channel, Diljit also interviewed Shah Rukh Khan where SRK pulled off a mimicry of Chadhaji's character successfully to Diljit in Chaddaji's language saying famous dialogue assisted by Kriti Sanon alongside Dilwale team, Varun Dhawan and Rohit Shetty for Dubsmash video.

Songs
Mukhtiar Chadha has music from JSL Singh and lyrics by rapper Ikka Singh.

Track listing
"Shoon Shaan" - Diljit Dosanjh
"Main Deewani" - Nooran Sisters
"Click Click" - Diljit Dosanjh
"Gapuchi Gapuchi Gum Gum" - Diljit Dosanjh
"Gun Vargi Bolian Pave" - Diljit Dosanjh
"Kol Kinare" - Diljit Dosanjh

Release
The film was released on 27 November 2015. Trailer of film was released on 22 October 2015 and was regarded as very funny.

Reception

Box office

Mukhtiar Chadha was released in 85 cinema halls in the five key international markets on 27 November such as Canada, UK, US, Australia, and New Zealand. It did decent business collecting  at the overseas box office in 10 days.

Critical response
CNN-IBN in their movie review by Divya Pal and live Twitter review appreciated the movie and actor Diljit Dosanjh. Hindustan Times reviewed the movie as a good watch and stated Diljit Dosanjh's comic timing makes it a fun film with a laughter guarantee for a good part of it. Jasmine Singh of The Tribune  wrote that Diljit has definitely showed yet again that he is a spontaneous actor who can act without a storyline and also the film has a lot of fun-filled moments. Punjabi channels like ABP Sanjha and Hamdard TV gave very positive reviews to the film.

References

External links
 
 
 Mukhtiar Chadha | Official Trailer with English Subtitle | Punjabi Movie | Diljit Dosanjh, Oshin Sai
 Eros International acquires Punjabi film – Diljit Dosanjh starrer Mukhtiar Chadha
 Official Facebook

2015 films
2015 romantic comedy films
Indian romantic comedy films
Punjabi-language Indian films
2010s Punjabi-language films